Eunice P. Shadd  also known as Eunice Lindsay (1846 – January 4, 1887) was a Canadian-American physician, born in Pennsylvania and raised in Chatham, Ontario. She was one of the first black women to graduate from Howard University College of Medicine.

Early life 
Eunice Shadd was born in 1846 in West Chester, Pennsylvania. She was one of 13 children born to Abraham D. Shadd and Harriet Burton Parnell, who were free African-Americans. Her father was a conductor on the Underground Railroad and known throughout anti-slavery activists.

Abraham moved his family in 1853 to Canada West (Ontario after confederation in 1867). Abraham was a landowner, politician, activist, and a farmer. He continued his efforts to aid people escape slavery in Canada. Her siblings were well-educated, many of her sisters were teachers. Isaac Shadd (also known as I.D. Shadd) was a newspaper publisher, printer, and bookkeeper before he became Speaker of the Mississippi House of Representatives. Her oldest sister, Mary Ann Shadd, became a prominent journalist and anti-slavery activist and her brother Isaac Shadd had a prominent and influential newspaper and political career.

Adulthood
Eunice Shadd left Canada and moved to Washington, D.C. to be with her siblings Mary Ann and Abraham. She enrolled in the Howard University Normal School in 1870 and graduated in 1872. Shadd taught public school, and then enrolled in Howard's medical program in 1875. At Howard, Shadd studied with Charles Purvis.

Shadd graduated from Howard University College of Medicine in 1877. That same year, she married Dr. Frank T. Lindsay, who had graduated from the Howard medical program in 1875. The couple then moved to Xenia, Ohio, where both practiced medicine.

Personal life

Shadd married Frank T. Lindsay, who was born in Jamestown, North Carolina, on December 28, 1849. He attended Oberlin College, Santhale Seminary, and Howard University College of Medicine, graduating in 1875 with a medical degree.

Eunice Shadd died on January 4, 1887, in Xenia. Lindsay remarried after Shadd's death.

Notes

References

External links 
William Shadd diary transcription, 1881-1885

1846 births
1887 deaths
African-American physicians
19th-century Canadian physicians
Howard University College of Medicine alumni
Created via preloaddraft